The 1991 Long Beach State 49ers football team represented California State University, Long Beach during the 1991 NCAA Division I-A football season.

Cal State Long Beach competed in the Big West Conference. The team was led by Willie Brown, and played home games at Veterans Stadium on the campus of Long Beach City College in Long Beach, California. The 49ers offense scored 207 points while the defense allowed 412 points.

This was the last season for Cal State Long Beach's football program.

Schedule

Team players in the NFL
With the end of the Cal State Long Beach football program, many players with eligibility remaining transferred to other schools. Two former 49ers were selected in subsequent NFL drafts.

In addition, one player who played at Cal State Long Beach in 1991 later played in the NFL, but was not drafted.

Notes

References

Long Beach State
Long Beach State 49ers football seasons
Long Beach State 49ers football